The 4th Mounted Division was a short-lived Yeomanry Division of the British Army active during World War I.  It was formed on 20 March 1916, converted to 2nd Cyclist Division in July 1916 and broken up on 16 November 1916.  It remained in England on Home Defence duties throughout its existence.

History

4th Mounted Division
The 4th Mounted Division was formed on 20 March 1916 from three 2nd Line mounted brigades (2/1st Eastern, 2/1st South Eastern and 2/1st South Western) and the new 2/1st Southern Mounted Brigade.  The Headquarters was at Colchester and Brigadier-General (Major-General from 26 May) Lord Lovat was appointed to command.  The brigades were stationed at Wivenhoe, Canterbury, Kelvedon and Manningtree; they were numbered as 13th, 14th, 15th and 16th Mounted Brigades, respectively, on 31 March.  Being formed relatively late, it did not appear to suffer the same organizational problems (lack of equipment and personnel) as other 2nd Line divisions, for example the 1st and 2/2nd Mounted Divisions.

2nd Cyclist Division
In July 1916 there was a major reorganization of 2nd Line yeomanry units in the United Kingdom.  All but 12 regiments were converted to cyclists: the rest were dismounted, handed over their horses to the remount depots and were issued with bicycles.  The 4th Mounted Division was reorganized as the 2nd Cyclist Division, now commanding the 5th, 6th, 7th and 8th Cyclist Brigades.  On reorganisation, 14th Mounted Brigadewith 2/1st Hertfordshire, 2/1st Queen's Own West Kent and 2/1st Essex Yeomanrywas posted to the new 1st Mounted Division (3rd Mounted Division redesignated) where it formed the new 3rd Mounted Brigade and remained mounted.  In exchange, the 10th Mounted Brigade (2/1st South Midland) joined as the 8th Cyclist Brigade.

The Headquarters remained at Colchester and the brigades at Wivenhoe, Kelvedon, Manningtree and West Malling.  It was assigned to the Southern Army, Home Defence Troops, and Lord Lovat remained in command.  The Headquarters moved to Ipswich in September 1916 and the brigade were now at Wivenhoe, Wingham, Woodbridge and Ipswich.

A further reorganization in November 1916 saw the 2nd Cyclist Division broken up. The cyclist brigades were dispersed and the yeomanry regiments were amalgamated in pairs to form Yeomanry Cyclist Regiments in new cyclist brigades.  The division had remained in England on Home Defence duties throughout its brief existence.

Orders of battle

See also

 List of British divisions in World War I
 British yeomanry during the First World War
 Second line yeomanry regiments of the British Army

Notes

References

Bibliography
 
 

4
4
Military units and formations established in 1916
Military units and formations disestablished in 1916
1916 establishments in the United Kingdom